|}

The Hurry Harriet Stakes is a Listed flat horse race in Ireland open to thoroughbred fillies and mares aged three years or older. It is run at Gowran Park over a distance of 1 mile, 1 furlong and 100 yards (1,902 metres), and it is scheduled to take place each year in August.

The race was first run in 2007.

Records
Most successful horse:
 no horse has won this race more than once

Leading jockey (4 wins):
 Pat Smullen – Chinese White (2009), Along Came Casey (2013), Carla Bianca (2014), Adool (2016)

Leading trainer (5 wins):
 Aidan O'Brien – Twirl (2012), Easter (2015), Alluringly (2017), Goddess (2019), Laburnum (2020)

Winners

See also
 Horse racing in Ireland
 List of Irish flat horse races

References 
Racing Post: 

Flat races in Ireland
Mile category horse races for fillies and mares
Gowran Park Racecourse
Recurring sporting events established in 2007
2007 establishments in Ireland